The Love Language is an American indie rock band from Raleigh, North Carolina, headed by Stuart McLamb.

Origin
The Love Language began after frontman Stuart McLamb's first band, The Capulets, broke up.  Following a breakup with his girlfriend, McLamb went on a drinking binge and then retreated to his parents' house, where he began recording a series of demos. These songs were originally intended to be heard only by McLamb's ex-girlfriend and a handful of friends, but the demos expanded into a full recording project.

Music
McLamb's first album, The Love Language, was released under Bladen County Records. Recorded entirely by McLamb, the album caught the attention of fellow North Carolina rockers, The Rosebuds, who asked The Love Language to open for them. To play live, McLamb formed a band with Kate Thompson (keyboard), Jeff Chapple (guitar), Josh Pope (bass), Tom Simpson (drums), and his brother Jordan McLamb (drums, acoustic guitar).

The Love Language was then signed to Durham-based Merge Records and released their second album Libraries in July 2010. Unlike the first album, Libraries was recorded in a traditional studio with help from producer BJ Burton.   

Burton was also recruited to play guitar while touring along with Missy, Jordan, Kevin, and Justin Rodermond (bass).

Discography

References

External links
 Official website
 Interview with Aquarium Drunkard

Indie rock musical groups from North Carolina
Musical groups from Raleigh, North Carolina
Musical groups established in 2008
2008 establishments in North Carolina
Merge Records artists